Foreign relations of the United States are the country's bilateral relations with other countries.

Foreign relations of the United States may also refer to:
Foreign Relations of the United States (book series) (FRUS), published by the U.S. Department of State
Foreign policy of the United States, goals and strategies of U.S. policy-makers